Børkop is a railway town in Vejle Municipality, Region of Southern Denmark in Denmark. It is located at the railroad between the cities of Vejle and Fredericia and is served by Børkop railway station. It has a population of 6,319 (1 January 2022).

Børkop was the municipal seat of the former Børkop Municipality, until 1 January 2007.

References

Further sources
 Project Runeberg - Kongeriget Danmark (J. P. Trap [1856-1906]; 2nd edition) 6. Deel. Amterne Aarhus, Vejle, Ringkjøbing, Ribe og Færøerne. Sted-Register og Supplement 272
 Danmarks Statistik: Statistisk Tabelværk Femte Række, Litra A Nr. 20: Folketællingen i Kongeriget Danmark den 5. november 1930; København 1935; p. 143
 Statistiske Undersøgelser Nr. 10: Folketal, areal og klima 1901-60; Det Statistiske Departement, København 1964; p. 185
 Statistiske Meddelelser 1968: 3. Folkemængden 27. september 1965 og Danmarks administrative inddeling; Danmarks Statistik, København 1968; p. 17

Cities and towns in the Region of Southern Denmark
Railway towns
Vejle Municipality